Small Soldiers (Music from the Motion Picture) and (Original Motion Picture Score) are the soundtrack and score to the film Small Soldiers.

Music from the Motion Picture
The soundtrack album was released on July 7, 1998 through DreamWorks Records and, with the exception of the last track, every track on the album was a combination of hip-hop/rap and modern rock/classic metal/alternative grunge. The soundtrack was not much of a success, only making it to 103 on the Billboard 200.

 "War" (Bone Thugs-n-Harmony with Henry Rollins, Tom Morello and Flea)
 "Another One Bites The Dust (Small Soldiers Remix)" (Queen featuring. Wyclef Jean, Pras, Free & Canibus)
 "The Stroke" (Billy Squier & Dallas Austin) (does not appear)
 "Love Is a Battlefield" (Pat Benatar, Queen Latifah & DJ Kay Gee)
 "Rock and Roll (Part 2)" (Gary Glitter & Dutch)
 "Love Removal Machine" (The Cult & Mickey Petralia)
 "My City Was Gone" (The Pretenders, Kool Keith & Butcher Brothers)
 "Surrender" (Cheap Trick & Rich Costey)
 "Tom Sawyer" (Rush & DJ Z-Trip)
 "War" (Edwin Starr)

Songs heard in the film but not on the soundtrack
 "Communication Breakdown" by Led Zeppelin
 "Wannabe" by Spice Girls

Original Motion Picture Score

The film's score was composed and conducted by frequent Joe Dante collaborator Jerry Goldsmith. The soundtrack album was first released in 1998 through Varèse Sarabande with nine tracks of score at a running time just over thirty-one minutes. In 2018, Varèse released a limited "deluxe" edition of the soundtrack containing the entire score, as well as alternates and additional music.

 Assembly Line (3:33)
 Alan and Archer (2:58)
 Roll Call (4:49)
 Prepare for Assault (3:46)
 Branded (2:15)
 Special Design (2:33)
 I'm Scared (2:01)
 Trust Me (4:04)
 Off to Gorgon (4:41)

References

Hip hop soundtracks
1998 soundtrack albums
1990s film soundtrack albums
DreamWorks Records soundtracks
Jerry Goldsmith soundtracks
Rock soundtracks
Albums produced by Jerry Duplessis
Albums produced by Mickey Petralia
Science fiction film soundtracks